Luis Proto Barbosa  was an Indian politician from the state of Goa. He served as the Chief Minister of Goa for eight months in 1990.

Barbosa was a member of the Indian National Congress.  He played a significant role in the historic Opinion Poll of 1967. He was one of the members elected to the first legislative assembly constituted after Goa's Liberation from Portuguese rule. He was also a doctor.
Barbosa headed a coalition government of 6 Congress defectors by joining in a coalition with the much larger 18 member Maharshtrawadi Gomantak Party.
He was affectionately known as Poto Barboz.

References

External links
 Goa Assembly - Chief Minister Profile, official version

 

Speakers of the Goa Legislative Assembly
Indian National Congress politicians from Goa
Chief Ministers of Goa
1927 births
2011 deaths
United Goans Party politicians
People from Margao
Goa, Daman and Diu MLAs 1963–1967